The 2013 FIBA Europe Under-18 Championship Division C was the 9th edition of the Division C of the FIBA U18 European Championship, the third tier of the European men's under-18 basketball championship. It was played in Andorra la Vella, Andorra, from 15 to 20 July 2013. San Marino men's national under-18 basketball team won the tournament.

Participating teams

First round

Group A

Group B

Playoffs

Final standings

References

FIBA U18 European Championship Division C
2013–14 in European basketball
FIBA U18
Sports competitions in Andorra la Vella
FIBA